Zacisze  is a village in the administrative district of Gmina Leśna, within Lubań County, Lower Silesian Voivodeship, in south-western Poland.

History
During World War II, the Germans operated the E227 forced labour subcamp of the Stalag VIII-B/344 prisoner-of-war camp in the village.

References

Zacisze